Daniel Thomas Fisher (born March 19, 1976) is an American retired indoor and beach volleyball player. He is the current head coach of the University of Pittsburgh women's volleyball team.

Personal life
Fisher is a native of Goleta, California. He graduated from Pacific in 1999 with a major in sociology and minor in religious studies. In 2008, he returned to Pacific as an assistant coach on the men and women's team and simultaneously earned a master's degree in sport science.

Fisher is married to Joni Fisher. They have a daughter, Eden, and son, Max. Fisher enjoys playing the guitar/ukulele in his spare time.

Playing career
Fisher began his collegiate volleyball career at Hawai'i where he played for two years. He transferred to Cal State Northridge but eventually left after playing for them for one year because they cut their men's volleyball program. He eventually settled on University of the Pacific and played for them until his graduation in 1999. After graduation, he played professionally in Europe for five years, including three in Spain and one season each in Belgium and Switzerland.

Fisher also represented team USA in both indoor and beach. He competed for five years on the AVP Professional Beach Volleyball Tour earning a pair of 13th-place finishes. He also represented team USA on the indoor side during tournaments in Japan and France in 2000 and 2001.

Coaching career

Fisher began his coaching career overseas, coaching Club Volleyball Menen for the 1999–2000 season and later spent the 2003–04 season coaching the Volleyball Club Appenzell Gotten Girl's Youth in Switzerland. Fisher also coached the Club Santa Barbara 16's in 2002. Prior to becoming a head coach, Fisher had various assistant coaching roles with multiple teams including San Francisco, Hawai'i, Pacific and the U.S. men's and women's national teams. He led the U.S. women's national team to a gold medal in the 2015 Pan American games and a bronze medal in the 2016 Pan American Cup.

Concordia Irvine
Fisher's first collegiate head coach job took him to Concordia University Irvine, where he led the team to two straight appearances in the NAIA National Championship match, winning the title in 2012. In his two years at Concordia, his teams went undefeated in conference play and had an overall 75–2 record.

His first season performance captured the attention of the volleyball community. The following summer, Hugh McCutcheon invited him to serve as an assistant with Team USA at the 2012 Pan American Cup, where he also coached alongside Hall of Fame coach Mike Hebert. After helping Team USA to a gold medal in the tournament, Hebert pulled Fisher aside and said he would put a good word in for him if he ever decided to try to go for a coaching job in a NCAA Division I school. After leading Concordia to the NAIA National Championship in 2012, Division I interest quickly started to build in Fisher.

Pittsburgh
In 2013, Fisher was named the head coach for the women's volleyball team at Pittsburgh. When Fisher took the helm at Pittsburgh, they were not a program in contention for national rankings and had not reached an NCAA Tournament since 2004.

In his first season, the Panthers began to show strength as they took then-No. 22 Purdue to five sets. He guided Pittsburgh to its highest totals in the following categories since 2009: hitting percentage (.230), kills/set (13.27), total kills (1725), assists/set (12.58), total assists (1635) and total aces (208) The Panthers chipped away for the next couple of seasons and reached the NCAA Tournament in 2016, their first trip since 2004. Then, Fisher led the Panthers to three straight ACC conference titles in 2017, 2018, and 2019. In 2020, despite the Panthers finishing 3rd in conference play, they advanced to the NCAA Elite Eight, the program's highest ever finish.

In 2021, Fisher led Pittsburgh to the first NCAA final four appearance in school history. The team defeated UMBC, Penn State, Kansas, and Purdue leading up the final four before losing to Nebraska by a score of 3–1. Pittsburgh finished the season with a 30–4 record. 

In 2022, Pittsburgh was the Co-ACC champions with Louisville, going 17–1 in conference play and advanced to its second straight NCAA final four, eliminating defending 2021 NCAA champion Wisconsin in the elite eight.

Head coaching record

References

1976 births
Living people
Pittsburgh Panthers volleyball coaches
American volleyball coaches
Pacific Tigers men's volleyball players
Hawaii Rainbow Warriors volleyball players
Cal State Northridge Matadors men's volleyball players
Pacific Tigers women's volleyball coaches
Pacific Tigers men's volleyball coaches
Hawaii Rainbow Warriors volleyball coaches
Concordia Eagles women's volleyball coaches
San Francisco Dons women's volleyball coaches
People from Santa Barbara, California
American men's volleyball players
American men's beach volleyball players
Expatriate volleyball players in Spain
Expatriate volleyball players in Belgium
Expatriate volleyball players in Switzerland
American expatriate sportspeople in Spain
American expatriate sportspeople in Belgium
American expatriate sportspeople in Switzerland